Oenomaus mentirosa is a species of butterfly of the family Lycaenidae. It occurs in lowland wet forest in Amazonian Peru.

The length of the forewings is 14.9 mm for males.

Etymology
The name of the species is derived from the Spanish word mentirosa (meaning "a feminine liar") and refers to the fact that the underside wing pattern resembles that of Porthecla gemma and Porthecla minyia, but this resemblance appears to be a false indicator of relationship.

References

Insects described in 2012
Eumaeini
Lycaenidae of South America